Shahid AHM Kamaruzzaman Government Degree College is a pass-level degree college in Boalia Thana, Rajshahi, Bangladesh. It was established in 1994 as Housing Estate College, and renamed after Shahid AHM Kamaruzzaman in 1997. It is affiliated with National University. This college has been declared a government college by the ministry of education in 2016.[4]It is situated in Uposhor New Market, Boalia, Rajshahi.[5]

References

Colleges in Rajshahi District
Universities and colleges in Rajshahi District
1994 establishments in Bangladesh
Educational institutions established in 1994